Aşıq Ümer (1621 — 1707) was a Crimean Tatar medieval poet of ashik, and is one of the most famous representatives of the Turkic-speaking ashik poetry in general. Ashik poetry is a special kind of literary oeuvre, the representatives of which — folk poets-singers — accompany their performances with playing the string-plucked musical instrument bağlama. Hence another name for this poetry — "bağlama poetry".

He wrote mainly lyric poems (on mystical content and related to a soldier's theme) in the forms of Turkic folk poetry. Aşıq Ümer is also an author of the poems that are traditional for classical oriental poetry — ghazals, rubaʿi etcetera. He greatly influenced the later poets-improvisers (ashiks).

References

Sources 
Ergun, Sadettin Nüzhet, Aşık Ömer. Hayatı ve şiirleri, Istanbul, 1936; Banarlı, Nihat Sami, Resimli Türk edebiyatı tarihi, Istanbul, 1949.
Ашик Омер. Краткая литературная энциклопедия. Т. 1. — 1962
Ашик Умер – самый известный в мире крымский певец любви — Крым.Реалии // RFEL
Mustafa Altuğ Yayla Yüzyıl osmanlı imparatorluğunda aşık ömer ve popüler kültür — Hacettepe Üniversitesi Sosyal Bilimler Enstitüsü // Ankara, 2013
 

Crimean Tatar writers
Crimean Tatar poets
1621 births
1707 deaths